The 1966 Canadian-American Challenge Cup was the inaugural season of the Can-Am auto racing series.  It was for FIA Group 7 racing cars running two-hour sprint events.  It began September 11, 1966, and ended November 13, 1966, after six rounds.

The series was won by John Surtees driving a Lola T70 Mk.2.

Schedule

Season results

Drivers Championship
Points are awarded to the top six finishers in the order of 9-6-4-3-2-1.

References

External links
 Season: 1966 (Canadian-American Challenge Cup), www.racingsportscars.com

 
Can-Am seasons
Can-Am